Antony Bek may refer to:

Antony Bek (bishop of Durham) (died 1311), 13th–14th century Prince-Bishop of Durham
Antony Bek (bishop of Norwich) (1279–1343), 14th century Bishop of Norwich, kinsman and namesake of the former